Veronica liwanensis, the Turkish speedwell, is a species of flowering plant in the family Plantaginaceae, native to northeast Turkey and the Caucasus. A tough, matforming perennial, adapted to drought and shade, and hardy to USDA zone 4, it is useful in rock gardens, particularly between stepping stones.

References

liwanensis
Flora of Turkey
Flora of the Transcaucasus
Plants described in 1849